The 1991 London Monarchs season was the inaugural season for the franchise in the newly created World League of American Football (WLAF). The team was led by head coach Larry Kennan and played its home games at Wembley Stadium in London, England. They finished the regular season in first place of the European Division with a record of nine wins and one loss. In the postseason, the Monarchs beat the New York/New Jersey Knights in the semifinals before capturing the first World League championship with a win over the Barcelona Dragons in World Bowl '91.

Personnel

Staff

Roster

Schedule

Standings

Game summaries

Week 1: at Frankfurt Galaxy

Week 2: vs New York/New Jersey Knights

Week 3: vs Orlando Thunder

Week 4: at Birmingham Fire

Week 5: vs Montreal Machine

Week 6: vs Raleigh-Durham Skyhawks

Week 7: at San Antonio Riders

Week 8: at New York/New Jersey Knights

Week 9: at Sacramento Surge

Week 10: vs Barcelona Dragons

Semifinal: at New York/New Jersey Knights

World Bowl '91: vs Barcelona Dragons

References

London Monarchs seasons